In the civil service of the United Kingdom,  His Majesty’s Exchequer, or just the Exchequer, is the accounting process of central government and the government's current account (i.e., money held from taxation and other government revenues) in the Consolidated Fund. It can be found used in various financial documents including the latest departmental and agency annual accounts.

It was the name of a British government department responsible for the collection and the management of taxes and revenues; of making payments on behalf of the sovereign and auditing official accounts. It also developed a judicial role along with its accountancy responsibilities and tried legal cases relating to revenue.

Similar offices were later created in Normandy around 1180, in Scotland around 1200 and in Ireland in 1210.

Etymology
The Exchequer was named after a table used to perform calculations for taxes and goods in the medieval period. According to the Dialogus de Scaccario ('Dialogue concerning the Exchequer'), an early medieval work describing the practice of the Exchequer, the table was large, 10 feet by 5 feet with a raised edge or "lip" on all sides of about the height of four fingers to ensure that nothing fell off it, upon which counters were placed representing various values. The name Exchequer referred to the resemblance of the table to a chess board (French: échiquier) as it was covered by a black cloth bearing green stripes of about the breadth of a human hand, in a chequer-pattern. The spaces represented pounds, shillings and pence.

The term "Exchequer" then came to refer to the twice yearly meetings held at Easter and Michaelmas, at which government financial business was transacted and an audit held of sheriffs' returns.

Exchequer of Normandy

The operation of an exchequer in Normandy is documented as early as 1180. This exchequer had broader jurisdiction than the English exchequer, dealing in both fiscal and administrative matters. The Dialogue concerning the Exchequer presents it as a general belief that the Norman kings established the Exchequer in England on the loose model of the Norman exchequer, while noting with some doubt an alternative view that the Exchequer existed in Anglo-Saxon times. The specific chronology of the two exchequers' foundings remains unknown.

Exchequer in England and Wales 
It is unknown exactly when the Exchequer was established, but the earliest mention appears in a royal writ of 1110 during the reign of King Henry I. The oldest surviving  Pipe Roll is that of 1130. Pipe Rolls form a mostly continuous record of royal revenues and taxation; however, not all revenue went into the Exchequer, and some taxes and levies were never recorded in the Pipe Rolls.

Under Henry I, a procedure adopted for the audit involved the treasurer drawing up a summons to be sent to each sheriff, who was required to answer with an account of the income in his shire both from royal demesne lands and from the county farm (a form of local taxation). The chancellor of the Exchequer then questioned him concerning debts owed by private individuals.

By 1176, the 23rd year of the reign of Henry II which is the date of the Dialogue concerning the Exchequer, the Exchequer was split into two components: the purely administrative Exchequer of Receipt, which collected revenue, and the Exchequer of Pleas, a law court concerned with the King's revenue. Appeals were to the Court of Exchequer Chamber. Following the proclamation of Magna Carta, legislation was enacted whereby the Exchequer would maintain the realm's prototypes for the yard and pound. These nominal standards were, however, only infrequently enforced on the localities around the kingdom.

From the late 1190s to the expulsion of the Jews in 1290, there was a separate division for taxation of Jews and the law-cases arising between Jews and Christians, called Exchequer of the Jews (Latin: Scaccarium Judaeorum).

Through most of the 1600s, goldsmiths would deposit their reserve of treasure with the Exchequer, sanctioned by the government. Charles II "shut up" the Exchequer in 1672, forbidding payments from it, in what Walter Bagehot described as "one of those monstrous frauds... this monstrous robbery". This ruined the goldsmiths and the credit of the Stuart government, which would never recover it. In 1694, the credit of William III's government was so bad in London that it could not borrow, which led to the foundation of the Governor and Company of the Bank of England.

The records of the Exchequer were kept in the Pell Office, adjacent to Westminster Hall, until the 19th century. The office was named after the skins (then "pells" or pelts) from which the rolls were made.

Officers

Reform and decline
In the 19th century, a number of reforms reduced the role of the Exchequer, with some functions moved to other departments. The Exchequer became unnecessary as a revenue collecting department in 1834 with the reforms of Prime Minister William Pitt, who also served as Chancellor of the Exchequer. The government departments collecting revenue then paid it directly to the Bank of England, with all money previously paid to the Exchequer being credited to the Consolidated Fund.
 
In 1866, the Standards Department of the Board of Trade took over metrological responsibilities and audit functions were combined with those of the Commissioners for auditing the Public Accounts under the new post of Comptroller and Auditor General. The name continued as the Exchequer and Audit Department from 1866 until 1983 when the new National Audit Office was created.
 
In modern times, "Exchequer" has come to mean the Treasury and, colloquially, pecuniary possessions in general; as in "the company's exchequer is low".

Exchequer in Scotland 

The Scottish Exchequer dates to around 1200, with a similar role in auditing and royal revenues as in England. The Scottish Exchequer was slower to develop a separate judicial role; and it was not until 1584 that it became a court of law, separate from the king's council.  Even then, the judicial and the administrative roles were never completely separated as with the English Exchequer.

In 1707, the Exchequer Court (Scotland) Act 1707 (6 Ann. c. 53) reconstituted the Exchequer into a law court on the English model, with a lord chief baron and four barons. The court adopted English forms of procedure and had further powers added. This was done in Section 19 of the Act of Union 1707

From 1832, no new barons were appointed; their role was increasingly assumed by judges of the Court of Session. By the Exchequer Court (Scotland) Act 1856 (19 & 20 Vict. c. 56), the Exchequer became a part of the Court of Session. A lord ordinary acts as a judge in Exchequer causes. The English forms of process ceased to be used in 1947.

Exchequer of Ireland

The Exchequer of Ireland developed in 1210 when King John of England reorganized the governance of his Lordship of Ireland and brought it more in line with English law. It consisted of the Superior Exchequer, a court of equity and revenue akin to the Exchequer of Pleas, and the Inferior Exchequer. The latter were the treasurers who handled all logistics from collecting the money (Teller or Cashier), logging it (Clerk of the Pells) and signing money orders accepting or paying money. It was managed by its own Chancellor of the Exchequer of Ireland and Chief Baron of the Irish Exchequer.

The Court of Exchequer (Ireland) existed from about 1299 to 1877. It was abolished under the Supreme Court of Judicature Act (Ireland) 1877 and was merged, along with the Court of King's Bench (Ireland), the Court of Chancery (Ireland)  and the Court of Common Pleas (Ireland), into the new High Court of Justice in Ireland (now replaced by the High Court).

The Central Fund, the Republic of Ireland's equivalent of the UK's Consolidated Fund, is colloquially called the Exchequer when distinguished as a component of government funding.

See also

Exchequer of Chester
Exchequer Standards
Fisc
History of the English fiscal system
Taxation in medieval England
Red Book of the Exchequer

References

Further reading 
 Keir, D. L., The Constitutional History of Modern Britain 1485–1937. Third Edition. A & C Black, 1946.
 Steel, Anthony The Receipt of the Exchequer, 1377–1485. Cambridge: Cambridge University Press, 1954.
 Warren, W. L., The Governance of Norman and Angevin England 1086–1272. Edward Arnold, 1987. 
 Madox, Thomas, 1666–1727; Fitzneale, Richard, 1130–1198; Gervasius, of Tilbury, supposed author (1711/1769), History of the Exchequer Published 1769, etext on archive.org 
 Murray, Athol L, Burnett, Charles J., The seals of the Exchequer of Scotland. Proc. Soc. Antiq. Scot. 123 (1993) 439–52
 

 National Archives of Scotland guide to Exchequer Records. nas.gov.uk
 Dialogue concerning the Exchequer yale.edu

External links

 HM Treasury history page

Government of the United Kingdom
Defunct departments of the Government of the United Kingdom
Exchequer offices
Taxation in England
History of taxation in the United Kingdom
Monarchy and money